Mirtha Michelle Castro Marmol (born January 17, 1984) is a Dominican-born American actress.

Career 
Michelle has appeared in Señorita Justice, This Christmas, Fast & Furious and Paydirt. She has also had small parts on CSI: Crime Scene Investigation and CSI: Miami.

When not acting, Michelle often emcees events in Las Vegas and Los Angeles.

Filmography

Film

Television

References

External links

Official homepage

1984 births
Living people
American film actresses
American television actresses
Place of birth missing (living people)
21st-century American women